Antonio Miguel Parra (born 26 December 1982) is a retired Spanish professional track cyclist. He claimed the men's madison title at the 2004 Spanish Track Cycling Championships in Palma de Mallorca, and later represented his nation Spain at the 2008 Summer Olympics. During his sporting career, Parra also raced for the Catalunya–Angel Mir and Massi pro cycling teams.

Parra qualified for the Spanish squad in the men's team pursuit at the 2008 Summer Olympics in Beijing based on the nation's selection process from the UCI Track World Rankings. He delivered the Spanish foursome of Sergi Escobar, Asier Maeztu, and David Muntaner a seventh-place time of 4:07.883 in the prelims before his team was later relegated and overlapped to New Zealand in the third match round.

Career highlights

2003
 1st Stage 3, Cinturó de l'Empordá, Vilabertran (ESP)
2004
 1st  Spanish Track Cycling Championships (Madison), Palma de Mallorca (ESP)
 1st Stage 1, Vuelta a Alicante, Torrevieja (ESP)
 3rd Stage 1, Vuelta Ciclista Internacional a Extremadura, Badajoz (ESP)
 3rd Stage 3, Cinturó de l'Empordá, Empuriabrava (ESP)
2006
 1st Stage 3, Vuelta Ciclista Internacional a Extremadura, Badajoz (ESP)
2008
 7th Olympic Games (Team pursuit), Beijing (CHN)
2009
 2nd Stage 7, Vuelta Ciclista a Chiapas, Tuxtla Gutiérrez (MEX)

References

External links
NBC Olympics Profile

1982 births
Living people
Spanish male cyclists
Spanish track cyclists
Cyclists at the 2008 Summer Olympics
Olympic cyclists of Spain
People from Baix Empordà
Sportspeople from the Province of Girona
Cyclists from Catalonia
21st-century Spanish people